Naděžda Koštovalová (née Tomšová; born 10 September 1971 in Tábor) is a retired Czech athlete who specialised in the 400 metres. She won a silver medal in the 4 x 400 metres relay at the 1995 World Indoor Championships. In addition, she represented her country at the 1996 Summer Olympics, as well as three outdoor World Championships.

Her personal best in the event is 51.84 seconds outdoors (Ostrava 1996) and 52.70 seconds indoors (Vienna 1995).

Competition record

References

1971 births
Living people
Czech female sprinters
Czechoslovak female sprinters
Athletes (track and field) at the 1996 Summer Olympics
Olympic athletes of the Czech Republic
People from Tábor
World Athletics Indoor Championships medalists
Competitors at the 1995 Summer Universiade
Competitors at the 1997 Summer Universiade
Olympic female sprinters
Sportspeople from the South Bohemian Region